John Winslow may refer to:
 John Winslow (1597–1674) early settler of Plymouth Colony
 John Winslow (British Army officer) (1703–1774), major-general of the colonial militia during the French and Indian War
 John F. Winslow (1810–1892), American businessman and iron manufacturer 
 John Ancrum Winslow (1811–1873), American rear admiral
 John B. Winslow (1851–1920), American jurist

See also
Winslow (disambiguation)